Pachyrhynchus argus is a species weevil in the family Curculionidae. It is a small black weevil, with blue-green rings on the elytra. This species can be found in Philippines.

References 

 F. P. Pascoe  Contributions towards a Knowledge of the Curculionid. Part II.
 Online Resource on Philippine Beetles

Brentidae
Beetles described in 1871
Insects of the Philippines